Herbert Roper Barrett and Charles Dixon defeated Alfred Beamish and James Cecil Parke 6–8, 6–4, 3–6, 6–3, 6–4 in the All Comers' Final, and then defeated the reigning champions Max Decugis and André Gobert 3–6, 6–3, 6–4, 7–5 in the challenge round to win the gentlemen's doubles tennis title at the 1912 Wimbledon Championships.

Draw

Challenge round

All comers' finals

Top half

Section 1

Section 2

Bottom half

Section 3

Section 4

References

External links

Men's Doubles
Wimbledon Championship by year – Men's doubles